Dungi is a town in the Islamabad Capital Territory of Pakistan. It is located at 33° 17' 25N 73° 18' 20E with an altitude of 441 metres (1447 feet). The population of the town is approximately 117,591.

References 

Union councils of Islamabad Capital Territory